Sing to Me is the eighth studio album by Australian soul/R&B singer Renée Geyer. The album was released in June 1985 and peaked at number 37 on the Kent Music Report. It was Geyer's first and only album released on the WEA label.

Track listing
Vinyl/ cassette (WEA – 252139.1)

Side one
"Without Love" (Marc Jordan, Renée Geyer) – 3:46
"All My Love" (Blondie Chaplin, Ray O'Hara) – 4:16
"Woman in Love" (Marc Hunter, Renée Geyer, Ricky Fataar) – 4:08
"Everyday of the Week" (Tim Finn) – 3:34
"Sing to Me" (Don Walker) – 3:11

Side two
"Telling It Like It Is" (Alan Mansfield, Johanna Pigott, Todd Hunter) – 4:12
"Fever" (John Capek, Michael Jay, Renée Geyer) – 4:27
"Guess Who I Saw Today" (Elisse Boyd, Murray Grand) – 3:53
"Faithful Love" (Marc Jordan, Steve Kipner) – 3:40
"Memory" (Alan Mansfield, Renée Geyer, Ricky Fataar, Todd Hunter, Wendy De Waal) – 4:04

Charts

References

External links
 

1985 albums
Renée Geyer albums
Electronic albums by Australian artists